WLFJ may refer to:

 WLFJ-FM, a radio station (89.3 FM) licensed to Greenville, South Carolina, United States
 WESC (AM), a radio station (660 AM) licensed to Greenville, South Carolina, which held the call sign WLFJ from 2000 to 2019